Terebralia sulcata is a species of sea snail, a marine gastropod mollusk in the family Potamididae.

Distribution
Malaysia, Vietnam, Red Sea, Madagascar.

Description

Ecology

Terebralia sulctata is a predominantly mangrove-associated species.

References

 Reid, D.G., Dyal, P., Lozouet, P., Glaubrecht, M. & Williams, S.T. (2008) Mudwhelks and mangroves: the evolutionary history of an ecological association (Gastropoda: Potamididae). Molecular Phylogenetics and Evolution 47: 680-699
 Lozouet P. & Plaziat J.C. (2008) Mangrove environments and molluscs. Abatan River, Bohol and Panglao Islands, central Philippines. Hackenheim: Conchbooks. 160 pp
 Liu, J.Y. [Ruiyu] (ed.). (2008). Checklist of marine biota of China seas. China Science Press. 1267 pp
 Brandt, R. A. M. (1974). The non-marine aquatic Mollusca of Thailand. Archiv für Molluskenkunde. 105: i-iv, 1-423. page(s): 195, pl. 14, fig. 39
 Yamanaka, T.; Mizota, C. (2001). Sulfur Nutrition of Gastropods and Bivalves Relevant to the Mangrove Forests: A Case Study from Central Sumatra, Indonesia. Venus (Journal of the Malacological Society of Japan). 60 (1-2): 71-78

External links
 Born, I. Von. (1778). Index rerum naturalium Musei Cæsarei Vindobonensis. Pars I.ma. Testacea. Verzeichniß der natürlichen Seltenheiten des k. k. Naturalien Cabinets zu Wien. Erster Theil. Schalthiere
 Schepman, H. H. (1895). A new Potamides. Notes from the Leyden Museum. 16: 133-135.

Potamididae
Gastropods described in 1778